Kurdistan referendum may refer to:

 2005 Kurdistan Region independence referendum
 2017 Kurdistan Region independence referendum